The Forbidden Room can refer to:

 The Forbidden Room (1914 film), a silent film directed by Allan Dwan
 The Forbidden Room (1977 film), a mystery film directed by Dino Risi
 The Forbidden Room (2015 film), a Canadian film directed by Guy Maddin